The 1944 Chicago White Sox season was the White Sox's 44th season in the major leagues, and their 45th season overall. They finished with a record of 71–83, good enough for 7th place in the American League, 18 games behind the first place St. Louis Browns.

Regular season

Season standings

Record vs. opponents

1944 Opening Day lineup 
 Skeeter Webb, SS
 Myril Hoag, CF
 Johnny Dickshot, LF
 Hal Trosky, 1B
 Guy Curtright, RF
 Grey Clarke, 3B
 Roy Schalk, 2B
 Tom Turner, C
 Orval Grove, P

Roster

Player stats

Batting 
Note: G = Games played; AB = At bats; R = Runs scored; H = Hits; 2B = Doubles; 3B = Triples; HR = Home runs; RBI = Runs batted in; BB = Base on balls; SO = Strikeouts; AVG = Batting average; SB = Stolen bases

Pitching 
Note: W = Wins; L = Losses; ERA = Earned run average; G = Games pitched; GS = Games started; SV = Saves; IP = Innings pitched; H = Hits allowed; R = Runs allowed; ER = Earned runs allowed; HR = Home runs allowed; BB = Walks allowed; K = Strikeouts

External links 
 1944 Chicago White Sox at Baseball Reference

Chicago White Sox seasons
Chicago White Sox season
Chicago White